Mikael Borglund (born 1956 in Hässelbystrand, Sweden) is a Swedish film producer in the successful Australian film and television series industry. He is also the managing director of Beyond International, Australia's leading television production and distribution companies.

References

External links

Beyond International

Australian people of Scandinavian descent
Australian people of Swedish descent
Swedish film producers
Australian film producers
People from Gothenburg
1956 births
Living people